Health care rationing refers to mechanisms that are used for resource allocation (viz. ration) in health care.

Overall health care

United States

Healthcare rationing in the United States of America is largely accomplished through market forces, though major government programs include Medicare, Medicaid, Veterans Affairs, and the Indian Health Service.  Most Americans have private health insurance, and non-emergency health care rationing decisions are made based on what the insurance company or government insurance will pay for, what the patient is willing to pay for (though health care prices are often not transparent), and the ability and willingness of the provider to perform uncompensated care.  The Emergency Medical Treatment and Active Labor Act of 1986 requires any properly equipped hospital receiving Medicare funds (nearly all private hospitals) to provide emergency healthcare regardless of citizenship, immigration status, or ability to pay. The government also regulates insurance policies, requiring coverage for some items and controlling the rules for who is eligible and what they can be charged.  The 2010 Patient Protection and Affordable Care Act (known as the PPACA or Obamacare) contained many changes to these regulations, including the first requirement that all Americans purchase health insurance (starting in 2014), which significantly changed the calculus of rationing decisions, including for preventive care.

United Kingdom
In the United Kingdom, the National Institute for Health and Care Excellence (NICE) sets coverage requirements for the National Health Service (NHS), which is funded and operated by the government. NICE calculates an incremental cost-effectiveness ratio in terms of quality-adjusted life years (QALY).  Treatments under £20,000 per QALY gained are considered cost-effective, but those above £30,000 per QALY are rarely approved.  Individuals who are able to do so may also pay for private treatments beyond what the NHS offers, but low-income people largely have equal access to health care.  The overall level of government funding for NHS is a political issue in the UK.  Local decisions about service provision in England are made by clinical commissioning groups.

As pressures on the NHS have increased there have been increasing local moves to restrict non urgent surgery for obese patients and smokers. Funding for in vitro fertilisation is reduced from three cycles to one for patients who meet the criteria; that female sterilisation is only funded in exceptional circumstances;  gluten free food will not be available on prescription for most patients who need it; and over the counter medicines will no longer be prescribed except in exceptional circumstances.

In 2006 Croydon Primary Care Trust produced a list of 34 procedures of limited clinical effectiveness which was circulated widely within the English NHS. Some were largely cosmetic, and others were used on patients who were unlikely to benefits from them. The London Health Observatory calculated that these procedures amounted to between 3% and 10% of clinical activity and that the resources could be used more effectively.  A similar list was produced by NHS England in June 2018.  It is proposed that surgery for snoring, dilatation and curettage for heavy menstrual bleeding, knee arthroscopies for osteoarthritis and injections for non-specific back pain will only be available in exceptional circumstances.

Specific eligibility criteria will be produced for 
Breast reduction
Removal of benign skin lesions
Grommets for Glue Ear
Tonsillectomy for sore throats
Haemorrhoid surgery
Hysterectomy for heavy menstrual bleeding
Chalazia (lesions on eyelids) removal
Anthroscopic compression for subacromial shoulder pain
Carpal tunnel syndrome release
Dupuytren's contracture release for tightening of fingers
Ganglion excision - removal of noncancerous lumps on the wrist or hand
Trigger finger release
Varicose vein surgery

This would affect about 100,000 patients every year and is claimed to free up about £200 million.

See also NHS treatments blacklist.

Economic totalitarian market-driven medical welfare state in the Netherlands

Insurance companies that are regulated to accept all customers or patients within the state-regulated public basic insurance policy, which requires egalitarian treatment of all customers or patients and reimbursement of all health care treatment prescribed by a gatekeeper medical doctor, covered by the policy and charged to a patient. This basic health care insurance policy often is obligatory for all residents in a country. While this system allows for a broad private enterprise market of health care services offered only to public basic insured patients with prescriptions from a gatekeeper. It may be referred to as a form of Rhenish capitalism. This system has the side-effect of the driving out of health care offered to patient seeking individually contracted medical services without gatekeeper doctors prescription. It therefore eliminates the market economy in health care. It effectively puts all residents on a market-driven medical welfare program that is rationing medical services and goods. A problem with this medical system is that the quality of its goods and services cannot be independently verified by freely contracting, and therefore the people have to rely on this medical system to verify the quality of its own services.

An example of the market-driven medical welfare state is the public healthcare system in the Netherlands, where these insurance companies receive, from tax revenue, an additional leverage sum with respect to the premium of about a factor 9. Although this policy eliminates one form of healthcare rationing namely waiting lines in the welfare state, it actually implements another type, namely 'rationing by a necessity scheme'. For example preventive healthcare services for the general risk group, like blood tests, endoscopy's and MRI scans are not provided by the gatekeeper and scarcely available in the market. Zvw-algemeen: Hoe werkt de Zorgverzekeringswet? – Verzekerde zorg – Zorginstituut Nederland Zorgverzekering (Nederland)

The market-driven medical welfare state is a form of economically totalitarian welfare-state capitalism, in the sense that there is private enterprise free-market but no patient contracting (also called 'over-the-counter') free-market. The public medical insurance policy becomes a compulsory cartel of private-enterprise public insurance companies and medical goods and services companies which results in an effective government-granted monopoly of these medical goods and services. It distributes medical goods and services to the patients in a Marxist egalitarian way, but does not use the classical Marxist state ownership of all means production. Note that Marxist egalitarianism can, in reality, be of the middle-stage or end-stage type depending whether distribution happens according to (non-monitary) contribution or necessity. Formally the gatekeeper general practitioners will determine the necessity of treatment and diagnostic health care.

The income of people working in the market-driven welfare state consisting of the public health care policy basic insurance, the corresponding insurance companies and the public health care service providers like public hospitals, private clinics and practices, which is based on mandatory premiums and state tax revenue contribution, does no longer directly depend on the forces of supply and demand, this works out particularly bad in country wide medical emergency situations, where the self-preservation of the medical welfare-state workers does not ultimately depend on servicing the patient customers. A principle that is firmly secured by Adam Smith's invisible hand serving the common good.

Shortages

Shortages of donated organs for transplantation has resulted in the rationing of hearts, livers, lungs and kidneys in the United States, mediated by the United Network for Organ Sharing. During the 1940s, a limited supply of iron lungs for polio victims forced physicians to ration these machines. Dialysis machines for patients in kidney failure were rationed between 1962 and 1967.  More recently, Tia Powell led a New York State Workgroup that set up guidelines for rationing ventilators during a flu pandemic.
Among those who have argued in favor of health care rationing are moral philosopher Peter Singer and Oregon governor John Kitzhaber.

See also
Rare disease
ICD coding for rare diseases

References

Economics articles
Health economics
Rationing